The Snipe World Championships are international sailing regattas in the Snipe International class organized by the Snipe Class International Racing Association (SCIRA) and the International Sailing Federation (ISAF).

There are four different championships: Open, Juniors, Women's and Masters.

History
In 1949, the decision was made to hold the championship, that took place every year except during World War II (1943–1944), every two years, and to hold Hemisphere Championships (Europe and Africa championship and Western Hemisphere & Orient Championship) and World Championships in alternate years.

in 1973, a Junior World Championship independent event was created. In 1986 the World Masters Championship and in 1994 the Women's World Championship were added.

Open Worlds

The Open World Championship, also known as senior worlds, or just World Championship, where the Commodore Hub E. Isaacks Trophy, O’Leary Trophy and Earl Elms Perpetual Trophy are awarded, is limited to the best national boats under an established quota based on the number of properly registered boat owners submitted to the SCIRA office by each National Secretary on the dues paid members for that year.

The following formula is used ("Registered Boats" must include: owner's name, address, fleet number and hull number to which the member has paid dues upon):

Additionally, the following skippers have an automatic entry to the championship that is not included in their home country’s quota:
Last World Champion, European Champion, Western Hemisphere & Orient Champion, Women’s World Champion and first and second place in the Junior World Championship.
Any former Commodore Hub E. Isaacks Trophy winning skipper.
One additional skipper from the host country, providing that it does not have among its other representatives the Junior or Senior World, European or Western Hemisphere & Orient Champion.
One additional skipper from the host fleet.

If the total entrants do not meet a total of 80 boats, those unassigned entry slots will be re-allocated to a pool of qualified entrants by SCIRA and the organizing authority.

Women's World Championship

The Women's World Championship, where the Roy Yamaguchi Memorial Trophy is awarded to the winning skipper and her crew, is held every 2 years in even numbered years.

Junior World Championship

The Junior World Championship, where the Vieri Lasinio Di Castelvero Trophy is awarded to the winning skipper, is open to contestants under 22 years old (not having their 22nd birthday during the calendar year the regatta is held). It is held every 2 years in odd numbered years. All skippers must be citizens or bonafide residents for at least one year, of the country they represent. Must have 3 countries to conduct a championship. Entries are limited to:
10 skippers per country.
One additional skipper from the host country, providing that it does not have among its other representatives the Junior World, Junior European or Junior WH&O Champion.
Current Junior World Champion, if he is otherwise eligible
Junior European Champion, if he is otherwise eligible
First Junior from Western Hemisphere & Orient Championship, if he is otherwise eligible

Masters World Championship

The Masters World Championship, where the Id Crook Memorial Trophy is awarded to the winning skipper and crew, is held every 2 years in even numbered years. It is open to boats where the skipper must be at least 50 years of age in the year of the regatta and the combined age of skipper and crew must be at least 80 years in the year of the regatta.

References

 
Recurring sporting events established in 1934